Qualia was a boutique brand of high-end electronics, created by Sony to showcase their best technology. Some Qualia products were newly designed while others were upgraded and rebranded versions of regular Sony products. The line was launched in Japan in June 2003 and the U.S. in April 2004. In 2005, Sony discontinued the Qualia series except in the United States.  In early 2006, Sony discontinued the series in the US as well.

Products

References
  "Sony Qualia, RIP: 2004 - 2005". Sep 21, 2005. www.engadget.com 

Sony products